was a Japanese actor. He won the award for best supporting actor at the 1st Yokohama Film Festival for Angel Guts: Red Classroom and Jūkyūsai no Chizu and at the 12th Yokohama Film Festival for Ware ni utsu yoi ari and Boku to, bokura no natsu. He died on March 30, 2014, of stomach cancer at the age of 69.

Filmography

Film

 Āa dōki no sakura (1967) - Second Sublieutenant Fawa
 Yasashii Nippon jin (1971)
 Kaoyaku (1971) - Sakamoto
 Asobi (1971)
 Arakajime ushinawareta koibitotchiyo (1971)
 Zatōichi goyō-tabi (1972)
 Goyōkiba (1972)
 Saihate no joji (1937) - Jirō
 Goyōkiba: Kamisori Hanzō jigoku zeme (1973)
 Goyōkiba: Oni no Hanzō yawahada koban (1974) - Mamushi
 Akasen tamanoi: Nukeraremasu (1974) - Shiwa
 Mutsugorō no kekkonki (1974)
 Okasu! (1976) - Truck Driver
 Utareru mae-ni ute! (1976) - Sone Genzo
 Kashin no irezumi: Ureta tsubo (1976) - Tattoo artist Tatsu
 Andō Noboru no waga tōbō to sex no kiroku (1976) - Kazuya Funabashi
 Brother and Sister (1976) - Kifuji
 Yokosuka otoko-gari: shoujo kairaku (1977) - Mickey Tokuda
 Onna kyōshi (1977) - Satoru Kobayashi
 Seibo Kannon daibosatsu (1977) - Man
 The Demon (1978) - Akutsu, Sōkichi's colleague
 Angel Guts: Red Classroom (1979) - Tetsuro Muraki
 Motto shinayaka ni, motto shitataka ni (1979)
 Jūkyūsai no Chizu (1979) - Konno
 Tenshi o yūwaku (1979)
 Warui yatsura (1980)
 Harukanaru sōro (1980) - Noboru Yamaguchi
 Furueru shita (1980) - Yamagishi
 Tosa No Ipponzuri (1980) - Katsu
 Muddy River (1981) - Policeman
 Yokohama BJ būrusu (1981)
 Enrai (1981) - Husband of kaede
 Farewell to the Land (1982) - Daijin
 Yaju-deka (1982) - Yakuza
 Fall Guy (1982) - Film Director
 Tantei monogatari (1983) - Detective Takamine
 Sukanpin walk (1984) - Ryusuke shiraki
 Yūgure zoku (1984) - Yasuhiko ōkubo
 Mattemashita tenkōsei! (1985)
 Nidaime wa Christian (1985) - Isomura
 Inujini sesi mono (1986) - Hitsuke
 Tabiji mura de ichiban no kubitsurinoki (1986)
 Koisuru Onnatachi (1986) - Teiko's father
 Sukeban Deka The Movie (1987) - Nishiwaki
 Sure Death 4: Revenge (1987) - Kyuzo
 Merodorama (1988)
 A Chaos of Flowers (1988) - Hogetsu Shimamura
 Yojo no jidai (1988)
 Bungakusho satsujin jiken: Oinaru jyoso (1989) - Kazuo Homata
 Zatoichi (1989)
 Boku to, bokura no natsu (1990)
 Rimeinzu: Utsukushiki yuusha-tachi (1990) - Handyman
 Ready to Shoot (1990) - Gunji
 Crest of Betrayal (1994) - Ichigaku Shimuzu
 Kura (1995) - Shin Hirayama
 Onihei hankachō (1995) - Kumehachi
 Takkyū onsen (1998)
 Ichigensan (2000) - Yakuza boss
 Drug (2001) - Yuji Takashina
 Nurse no oshigoto: The Movie (2002) - Detective Kumano
 Mana ni dakarete (2003) - Kai
 The Boat to Heaven (2003)
 Maze (2006)
 Sway (2006) - Osamu Hayakawa
 Tengoku wa matte kureru (2007)
 Zenzen daijobu (2008) - Eitaro
 The Little Maestro (2012) - Arasawa, Genji

Television
 Kaze to Kumo to Niji to (1976)
 Oretachi wa Tenshi da! (1979) Episode19
 Shadow Warriors III (1983) - Toramaro
 Haru no Hatō (1985) - Shūsui Kōtoku
 Sukeban Deka II: The Legend of the Girl In The Iron Mask (1985) - Nishiwaki
 Onihei Hankachō (1989) - Kumehachi
 The Abe Clan (1995) - Abe Gonbei
 Aoi Tokugawa Sandai (2000) - Fukushima Masanori
 Galileo (2008) - Yukimasa Tomonaga
 Ryōmaden (2010) - Yajiro Iwasaki
 Amachan (2013) - Chūbē Amano

References

1944 births
2014 deaths
Japanese male film actors
Japanese male television actors
Pink film actors
People from Tokyo
Deaths from cancer in Japan
Deaths from stomach cancer